Beatservice Records (established 10 October 1994 in Tromsø, Norway) is a Norwegian record label releasing electronic music. It was initiated by Vidar Hanssen who was DJing for a local student radio with the program The Beatservice Radio Show at the time. Beatservice Records have released music ranging from minimalistic ambient via house and experimental techno to drum and bass. The label was an important factor in the mid-to-late 1990s popularity of the Tromsø based electronic music scene, both in Norway and elsewhere.

It has released music by artists such as Biosphere, Elektrofant, Aedena Cycle, Kolar Goi, Flunk, Ralph Myerz, Xploding Plastix, Teebee, Sternklang, Kim Hiorthøy, Howard Maple, Bjørn Torske and Frost.

See also 
 List of record labels

References

External links
 Official site
 Norwegian Electronic Discography hosted by Beatservice

Norwegian record labels
Electronic music record labels
Record labels established in 1995
1995 establishments in Norway
Ambient music record labels
House music record labels
Drum and bass record labels
Techno record labels